Seyyedabad-e Akrad (also Romanized as Seyyedābād-e Āḵrād; also known as Seyyedābād) is a village in Miyan Jovin Rural District, Helali District, Joghatai County, Razavi Khorasan Province, Iran. At the 2006 census, its population was 373, in 80 families.

References 

Populated places in Joghatai County